Mlynica (German: Mühlenbach) is a village and municipality in Poprad District in the Prešov Region of northern Slovakia. It lies on the foothills of High Tatras.

Geography
The municipality lies at an altitude of 688 metres and covers an area of 7.776 km². It has a population of about 380 people.

History
In historical records the village was first mentioned in 1268. It belonged to a German language island. The German population was expelled in 1945.

Infrastructure and economy
Main cultural sightseeings are romanesque Roman Catholic and classical evangelical church. Touristic infrastructure dominates village economy and the construction of new recreational facilities is in process.

References

External links
https://web.archive.org/web/20160804151402/http://mlynica.e-obce.sk/

fix indexing